

BekaertDeslee 

BekaertDeslee is a textile company specialized in the production of knitted and woven mattress fabrics and mattress covers. The headquarters is located in Waregem, Belgium. The company was founded in 1892 as Bekaert Textiles by Ivo Bekaert. In 2015, the company became part of Franz Haniel & Cie., a German family equity company. In 2016, Bekaert Textiles acquired DesleeClama and became BekaertDeslee.

History

References

External links 
Company website
Mattress protection

Companies based in West Flanders